Boath is a surname. Notable people with the surname include:

Allan Boath (born 1958), New Zealand footballer
Freddie Boath (born 1991), English actor
Richard Boath (born 1958), British banker